Sociedad Deportiva Ciudad de Santiago, S.A.D. was a Spanish football team based in Santiago de Compostela, in the autonomous community of Galicia. Founded in 1978 as Club Atlético Fátima, it played its last season in Tercera División - Group 1, holding home games at Estadio Multiusos de San Lázaro, with a capacity of 13,000 seats. Finally, the team disappeared in 2009, being re-founded as "Club Atlético Fátima" again.

History
The team began its existence as Club Atlético Fátima, a team from the O Castiñeiriño neighborhood, being founded on June 14, 1978, and was federated within a few days. Its first president was Manuel Paz Nogueira, and the new club would have lower categories within its initial purpose, the soccer education of the youth of the city.

The team began its journey in the lower categories of Galician sport and remained in those divisions for much of its existence. However, the team underwent a great evolution from the year 2005, when the club promoted to Regional Preferente de Galicia and started a project to try to become the first club in Santiago de Compostela, receiving most of the money awarded by the Santiago City Council to sports clubs to the detriment of SD Compostela, and with the support of local sponsoring companies. The club converted to Sociedad Anónima Deportiva in a vote and was renamed Ciudad de Santiago from the 2005–06 season.

In the 2006–07 season the club ascended to Tercera División. The team moved to the Estadio Multiusos de San Lázaro and signed for the occasion several players from other Galician teams and others with experience in the First Division such as Changui. After finishing first in the regular phase, it promoted to Segunda División B after winning UD Almansa.

In the 2008–09 season, the team finished in 13th position in Segunda División B, but in August was relegated to the fourth level, for failing to pay its players their due salaries. On 29 December, it didn't take the pitch against Coruxo FC due to economic problems, thus being disqualified from the competition, and folding soon after.

Club names
Atlético Fátima – (1978–2005)
SD Ciudad de Santiago – (2005–09)

Season to season

1 season in Segunda División B
2 season in Tercera División

Famous players
 Justice

References

External links
Official website 

Association football clubs established in 1978
Association football clubs disestablished in 2009
Defunct football clubs in Galicia
Football clubs in Galicia (Spain)
Sport in Santiago de Compostela
1978 establishments in Spain
2009 disestablishments in Spain